Mannheim is an electoral constituency (German: Wahlkreis) represented in the Bundestag. It elects one member via first-past-the-post voting. Under the current constituency numbering system, it is designated as constituency 275. It is located in northwestern Baden-Württemberg, comprising the city of Mannheim.

Mannheim was created for the inaugural 1949 federal election. Since 2021, it has been represented by Isabel Cademartori of the Social Democratic Party (SPD).

Geography
Mannheim is located in northwestern Baden-Württemberg. As of the 2021 federal election, it is coterminous with the independent city of Mannheim.

History
Mannheim was created in 1949, then known as Mannheim-Stadt. In the 1965 through 1998 elections, it was named Mannheim I. It acquired its current name in the 2002 election. In the 1949 election, it was Württemberg-Baden Landesbezirk Baden constituency 2 in the number system. In the 1953 through 1961 elections, it was number 176. In the 1965 through 1998 elections, it was number 179. In the 2002 and 2005 elections, it was number 276. Since the 2009 election, it has been number 275.

Originally, the constituency was coterminous with the independent city of Mannheim. In the 1965 through 1972 elections, it comprised the Stadtbezirke of Innenstadt/Jungbusch, Neckarstadt-West, Neckarstadt-Ost/Wohlgelegen, Sandhofen, Schönau, Waldhof, Käfertal, Vogelstang, and Schwetzingerstadt/Oststadt from the city of Mannheim. In the 1976 election, it gained the Stadtbezirke of Feudenheim and Wallstadt. Since the 2002 election, it has again been coterminous with the city of Mannheim.

Members
The constituency has been held by the Social Democratic Party (SPD) during all but four Bundestag terms since its creation. It was first represented by Carlo Schmid from 1949 to 1972, followed by Werner Nagel from 1972 to 1990. Siegfried Vergin then served one term. Egon Jüttner of the Christian Democratic Union (CDU) was elected in 1994, but Lothar Mark regained the constituency for the SPD in 1998, and served until 2009. Former member Jüttner was elected again in 2009, and served until 2017. Nikolas Löbel of the CDU was elected in 2017. Isabel Cademartori won the constituency for the SPD in 2021.

Election results

2021 election

2017 election

2013 election

2009 election

References

Federal electoral districts in Baden-Württemberg
1949 establishments in West Germany
Constituencies established in 1949
Mannheim